Infinity Online is a free action MMOG created by the Korean software company Windysoft. It was supposed to be released on October 12, 2006, but due to an IDC problem, was released internationally on October 17. Gameplay is similar in style to Rakion with separate game rooms for players to enter, and players have the option of using a mouse and keyboard or a controller to control their character. There are both player versus player and mission modes where players cooperate to defeat AI enemies. The in-game currency is the luna. Game Tribe is currently working on the Europe version of Infinity Online.

For contractual and other reasons, Gametribe has implemented an IP block on users in the United States.

PvP
In PvP mode, players can host a game with guards or without guards. In a game with guards, each player receives four guards (different guards can be purchased with luna) and can use a number of items spread throughout the map to aid them or harm other players. A game without guards does not include items. Additionally, hosts can choose to make the matches free-for-all (solo), team (players designate teams), or random (teams chosen randomly).

Mission
In mission mode, players cooperate with each other to complete a certain goal that varies between missions. Ranks that decide the rewards are given to the players based on performance. More difficult missions require that the player who wishes to host them purchases temporary mission licenses. Some missions have an admission fee that is determined by the difficulty selected for the mission.

Characters
At the beginning of the game, players can choose from four different characters, each of which use different weapons and attacks. Three different variations exist for each of these characters: normal, swimsuit, and uniform.

Base characters
Base characters are the normal variations of the nine characters in Infinity, four of which you start out with.

Starting characters

These characters are available at the start for anyone.
 Juru- a female character who uses an axe for powerful, concentrated attacks.
 Kirious- a male warrior who uses a pike in wide area attacks.
 Baek-ho- a male character who uses a sword and claw in fast, linear attacks.
 Elina- a female character who uses a dual-sided spear in quick strikes.

Bought characters
 Kain- a dual-wielding swordsman.
 Alexia- a female mage notable for her attacks who uses a book and magic attacks.
 Violet- a female character who uses a scythe.
 Dorosi- a gargantuan male character who uses a cudgel.
 Xiyun- a female character who uses two clubs in fast combos.

Swimsuit characters
All of the above characters are available in the swimsuit variety, which are purchased separately for 6,400 luna and have different skills and clothing sets (usually shorts and bikini style beach wear) from their normal counterparts. They also use the same weapons with the exception of an expensive summer weapon available only to the swimsuit variety of the character, such as inflatable toys and beach chairs. Swimsuit character's clothing and special weapons are significantly more expensive than those of the normal characters.

Uniform characters
Uniform characters gives the same bonus as swimsuits.

Items
There are many items in Infinity Online that let players change their appearance, or gain extra abilities. These can be bought at the store, or earned through missions.

Store bought items
Store items are purchasable by anyone, and only require that you have enough Luna. The store is broken up into six categories.

Item
 You can use Luna to buy armor for a character. Usually, each character has main clothing, sub clothing, and three accessories. Armor comes in sets based on style (e.g. Kirius Dark set, or Dorosi Beach set), but players can mix and match these as they want without any changes, because armor doesn't affect your performance until it's infused with runes, and different styles do not have different effects. Armors have three rune slots each.
 Weapons can be bought in six elements; Fire, Wind, Ice, Lightning, Divine and Dark, and a weapon costing 2,950 Luna and one costing 11,500 Luna exist for each of these. The difference between the two is that the more expensive already comes with three elemental runes infused to it, while the cheaper one allows you to infuse whatever you wish to it. Weapons have five rune slots each.
 Another appearance-altering item is hair dye, which can be bought and applied immediately to change a character's hair color. Dye is available in red, yellow, black, violet and white, as well as bleach which returns hair back to its original color.

Skills

Skills can be purchased from the store as well as the Skill Hive Panel.

Hero

Allows you to purchase a new Hero, without any weapons or armor.

Guard

Guards can be used in guard-entry PvP matches. Players start out with three Alitarian guards, but advanced guards can be bought here.

General
 Backpacks increase the number of items you can carry in-game, such as potions which are used for recovering HP and SP, as well as elemental orbs which can be used to unleash strong area-based mana attacks.
 Licenses are bought at the store to grant players the ability to host games which require licenses or tickets to host. Licenses can be used to open a mission three times a day, while mission tickets can be earned or bought, and let a player open a mission a set number of times.
 Inventory expansions increase the number of banked items a player can have, which includes all those used by any of their characters.
 Rank hiding items give you the option to mask your level and make it appear to be different from other players.
 Hive Panel tickets activate the Skill Hive, which gives players the ability to unlock new skills if they have already bought those adjacent to it.
 Summer Packages are bundles which contain a swimsuit character, as well as all the weapons and accessories. These are popular gifts.
 Items that hide accessories and upgrades from other players.
 Coupons that grant the player one weapon, or one piece of armor.
 Name alterations to change your nickname, or that of your guards.

Potion

Potions that can be used in Mission mode with the use of a backpack can be purchased from this section of the store.
 HP Potions- Come in quantities that restore 20, 30 and 50 HP.
 SP Potions- Come in quantities that restore 10, 20 or 30 SP.
 Crystals- Can be bought in the six elements; Fire, Wind, Ice, Lightning, Divine and Dark. These release a powerful mana attack when used.

External links
 Infinity Online Official European Site [Closed]
 Infinity Online Official Korean Site [Closed]

2006 video games
Massively multiplayer online games
Video games developed in South Korea
Windows games
Windows-only games
Inactive massively multiplayer online games